Meller's duck (Anas melleri) is a species of the dabbling duck genus Anas. It is endemic to eastern Madagascar. Although a population was established on Mauritius in the mid-18th century, this is on the verge of extinction due to habitat loss and competition by feral domestic ducks. The species name of this species is after the botanist Charles James Meller, and its generic name is from the Latin for "duck".

Description 

The Meller's duck resembles a large female mallard. At , it averages slightly larger than a mallard and is at the top size for the genus Anas. However, as opposed to most mallard relatives, they lack a supercilium. The speculum feathers are green as in some of its relatives, but unlike in these, it is bordered white as in the mallard. Its body is dark brown with narrow paler fringes to feathers on upper parts and wider fringes on lower parts.  Its bill is pale grey, with dark patches at the base, and is larger than normal. Its feet and legs are orange.

Behaviour 
Meller's duck breeds apparently during most of the year except May–June on Madagascar, dependent on local conditions; the Mauritian population has been recorded to breed in October and November. Unlike most of their closer relatives—with the exception of the African black duck—they are fiercely territorial during the breeding season; furthermore, pairs remain mated until the young are independent.

Conservation 
This species is listed as an endangered species by the IUCN Red List. The Lac Alaotra wetlands, where historically the largest number of these birds was to be found, have suffered habitat destruction on a large scale in the latter half of the 20th century, and local waterbird populations have declined dramatically. The Madagascar pochard was rediscovered in 2006, though not in the Lac Alaotra area.

The conservation of this species was long hampered by its—entirely erroneous, see below—dismissal as a variant of the mallard which deserved no special interest. Due to its drab plumage and territorial habits, this species is not very popular among aviculturalists, although it reproduces readily in captivity like most ducks if enough space and good habitat are provided. Although a captive breeding program exists (part of the European Endangered Species Programme), the species is not very often kept in zoos either; it can be more frequently seen in Europe, such as in EEP members Cologne Zoo, Edinburgh Zoo, Durrell Wildlife Park, and Zürich Zoo.

Relations 
Due to the outward similarity of Meller's duck to the female mallard, it was commonly placed close to that species. Based on records of quasi-forced hybridization under unnatural conditions, it was even proposed to be a mere color morph of the mallard.

Nowadays, it is regarded as one of the most distinct species in the mallard group, based on behavioural and mtDNA D-loop sequence comparisons. Its closest relatives is apparently the yellow-billed duck, another early divergence of the mallard clade, in which these species and the African black duck are basal, but the exact relationships of Meller's and the yellow-billed ducks to that species are fairly obscure. (The dates in these studies are probably far too recent in the face of the Early Pleistocene fossil record of mallards and the crude methodology used to arrive at the estimate.)

References

External links 

BirdLife Species Factsheet
Photo at mangoverde.com

Meller's duck
Meller's duck
Endemic birds of Madagascar
Meller's duck
Meller's duck